Bukovats may be the pronunciation of either:
 Bukovac, several places in Bosnia and Herzegovina, Serbia and Croatia
 Bucovăț, several places in Romania and Moldavia